Modibo Dembélé (born 14 August 1993) is a French-born Malian footballer who plays as a defensive midfielder for Sainte-Geneviève Sports.

International
Dembélé was called up to the Mali national under-20 football team for the 2016 Toulon Tournament, and made his debut in a 3–3 tie with the Mexico U20s.

References

1993 births
Living people
Footballers from Val-de-Marne
Association football midfielders
Citizens of Mali through descent
Malian footballers
Malian expatriate footballers
Mali under-20 international footballers
French footballers
French sportspeople of Malian descent
Stade Lavallois players
Brescia Calcio players
Sainte-Geneviève Sports players
Ligue 2 players
Championnat National 2 players
Championnat National 3 players
Expatriate footballers in Italy
Black French sportspeople